Biswajit Kalai is a Tipra Indian politician from Tripura. He won the 2023 Tripura Legislative Assembly election as a candidate of Tipra Motha Party from Takarjala Assembly constituency in the record margin of 32,455 votes.

Political career
Kalai started his political career as a leader of Twipra Students' Federation.

References

 Tripuri people
 living people
Tripura MLAs 2023–2028
Year of birth missing (living people)
Place of birth missing (living people)
People from Sipahijala district
Tipra Motha Party politicians